The Murphy Varnish Works is located in Newark, Essex County, New Jersey, United States. The building was built in 1865 to manufacture varnish and was added to the National Register of Historic Places on March 9, 1979.

See also
National Register of Historic Places listings in Essex County, New Jersey

References

Industrial buildings and structures on the National Register of Historic Places in New Jersey
Italianate architecture in New Jersey
Industrial buildings completed in 1865
Buildings and structures in Newark, New Jersey
National Register of Historic Places in Newark, New Jersey
New Jersey Register of Historic Places
Varnishes
1865 establishments in New Jersey